The Crandell Theatre is located in the Village of Chatham, NY and  is Columbia County’s oldest and largest movie theatre. The Crandell was built by Walter S. Crandell, a Chatham native and local banker. Considered an architectural gem, the theater was constructed in Spanish Renaissance style and remains largely unchanged since it opened on Christmas Day, 1926, with a Jules Verne photoplay.  It’s the oldest theater in Columbia County, with a seating capacity of 534.  it was listed on the National Register of Historic Places in 2017.
 
Constructed on the site of a house formerly owned by the Crandell family, the pink brick and stucco theater was built at a cost of $100,000 pre-Depression dollars. It was envisioned as a venue for traveling vaudeville shows and silent pictures. However, in recognition of the growing importance of talking movies after “The Jazz Singer” was released in 1927, the theater installed talking and sound-making equipment in 1929. 
 
The Crandell has been in continuous operation for 83 years. For nearly 50 of those years it has been associated with the Quirino family. Anthony Quirino purchased the Crandell in 1960, and the theater  was owned and operated by his son, Tony until his death in 2010. It is now owned and operated  by The Chatham Film Club, a volunteer, not-for-profit organization committed to bringing art, independent, and foreign film to Columbia County.

The Crandell Theater specializes in both first run and second run movies, family-oriented movies and also hosts many community events. 
 

The Crandell Theatre is the main venue for the FilmColumbia Festival, an annual 5-day film festival held every October.

The Crandell also hosts Farm Film Fest, a day of film about local farming in Columbia County, NY sponsored by The Chatham Agricultural Partnership, The Chatham Film Club, and The Columbia Land Conservancy Programming Committee.

References 
 http://www.crandelltheatre.org
 http://thechathamfilmclub.com/
 http://filmcolumbia.com

Articles 
 https://www.npr.org/2008/10/24/96124905/small-town-festival-focuses-on-films-not-stars
  
 http://blog.timesunion.com/realestate/report-crandell-theater-may-have-a-new-owner/3335/
 http://www.ruralintelligence.com/index.php/arts_section/arts_articles_movies/chatham_film_club_prevails_crandell_theatre_set_to_re-open_july_4/
 

Cinemas and movie theaters in New York (state)
National Register of Historic Places in Columbia County, New York
Buildings and structures in Columbia County, New York